Estadio Luis Rodríguez Olmo is a multi-use stadium in Arecibo, Puerto Rico.  It is currently used mostly for baseball games and is the home of Lobos de Arecibo.  The stadium holds 9,000 people.

References

Buildings and structures in Arecibo, Puerto Rico
Baseball venues in Puerto Rico